Lyon Village is a neighborhood, or "urban village" located in Arlington County, Virginia, along Lee Highway (U.S. Route 29). It adjoins Arlington County's government center (including the courthouse and police/jail complex), and is approximately one mile west of Rosslyn and less than a mile north of Clarendon, of which it is sometimes considered a sub-neighborhood, as is Cherrydale, the mostly residential district immediately west of Lyon Village.

Modern geography
The Lyon Village Historic District encompasses 1,073 contributing buildings and 1 contributing structure. The District as a "cohesive residential neighborhood in northern Arlington County, Virginia, located immediately north of the Clarendon Commercial District and roughly nestled between Wilson Boulevard to the south and Lee Highway to the north." Major thoroughfares provide access to commercial and employment centers in the surrounding county and nearby Washington, D.C. The 191 acre historic neighborhood extends east to North Veitch Street and westward to North Kirkwood Road, including forty-three acres more than the original 148 acres platted by Frank Lyon in 1923.

The neighborhood's commercial center presently includes a shopping center, with a Starbucks, Giant supermarket, CVS, and other stores, located at the confluence of Lee Highway, Spout Run Parkway and Interstate 66 (I-66). The area also includes a community house; a Veterans of Foreign Wars hall named for the developer's son, John Lyon, who died in World War I lies immediately east of the neighborhood. Parts of the neighborhood are near the Clarendon and Court House stations of Metrorail's Orange Line.

History

According to the Arlington County Library, Robert Cruit, an immigrant from Devonshire, England, purchased land in the Clarendon area in 1825 for a farm. In 1923, his heirs sold the land to developer Frank Lyon, who subdivided it into tracts for residential development, including the eponymous Lyon Village. Most of the single-family homes in the neighborhood were constructed in the 1920s and 1930s. The Civil War Fort Strong which once protected Washington DC is now long gone, replaced by multi-story apartment buildings overlooking Interstate 66. There have been a growing number of teardowns (as of 2016).

The first portion of the neighborhood to be platted as Lyon Village (by Frank Lyon in 1923) was landscaped with tree-lined streets, traffic circles, and an intricate system of curvilinear roads that complemented the less-than-one-acre housing lots. Aurora Heights and portions of Clarendon now fall within the current boundaries of Lyon Village and contain residential buildings constructed prior to Lyon's purchase of the Cruit property. Lyon Village was further enlarged by the platting of adjacent blocks with a more grid-like street pattern from the 1930s to the 1950s.

Lyon Village is defined by a variety of 20th-century architectural styles and building types ranging from early-20th-century high style to vernacular interpretations of the elaborate styles traditionally erected decades earlier. Primarily, the domestic buildings in Lyon Village range from the 1880s to infill housing of the late 1990s. Building forms and styles extend from the imposing brick Colonial Revival-style dwelling to the smaller bungalow. Architectural styles presented in Lyon Village were often diluted, illustrating modest examples of Queen Anne, Colonial Revival, Craftsman, Tudor Revival, Classical Revival and Spanish Mission Revival styles. The community is primarily made up of single-family dwellings, supported along the borders by multiple-family apartment buildings, a landscaped park and community building, churches, and commercial buildings (which are not included in the historic district). Many of the properties include freestanding or attached garages and sheds. The buildings, particularly the single-family dwellings, are buffered from the public streets by sidewalks and grassy medians.

References

External links

   Map showing boundaries of Lyon Village neighborhood.
Lyon Village apartments, local apartment buildings built by Frank Lyon
Lyon Village Citizens Association, a voluntary neighborhood organization

Urban Villages: Lyon Village - By the ART Commuter Page

Houses on the National Register of Historic Places in Virginia
Historic districts in Arlington County, Virginia
National Register of Historic Places in Arlington County, Virginia
Neighborhoods in Arlington County, Virginia
Houses in Arlington County, Virginia